Edward Harvey Bulley (born March 25, 1955) is a Canadian former professional ice hockey player.

Drafted in 1975 by both the Chicago Black Hawks of the National Hockey League and the Quebec Nordiques of the World Hockey Association, Bulley played for the Black Hawks, Washington Capitals, and Pittsburgh Penguins. He also played one season for the Baltimore Skipjacks of the American Hockey League before retiring from active play.

In 414 NHL games, Bulley had 101 goals and 113 assists.

Career statistics

Transactions
On June 3, 1975 the Chicago Blackhawks drafted Ted Bulley in the seventh-round (#115 overall) of the 1975 NHL Draft.
On August 24, 1982 the Chicago Blackhawks traded Dave Hutchison and Ted Bulley to the Washington Capitals in exchange for a 1983 sixth-round pick (#115-Jari Torkki) and a 1984 fifth-round pick (#101-Darin Sceviour).
On September 30, 1983 the Pittsburgh Penguins signed free agent Ted Bulley.

References

External links

1955 births
Living people
Baltimore Skipjacks players
Canadian ice hockey left wingers
Chicago Blackhawks draft picks
Chicago Blackhawks players
Dallas Black Hawks players
Flint Generals (IHL) players
Hull Festivals players
Ice hockey people from Ontario
Sportspeople from Windsor, Ontario
Pittsburgh Penguins players
Quebec Nordiques (WHA) draft picks
Washington Capitals players
Windsor Spitfires players